John Joel Rucker (January 15, 1917 – August 7, 1985), nicknamed "The Crabapple Comet," was an American professional baseball player, an outfielder who appeared in 705 Major League Baseball games played, 607 as a center fielder, over six seasons (1940–1941; 1943–1946) for the New York Giants. He attended the University of Georgia. When he joined the Giants in 1940, he was enthusiastically hailed by the ballclub as "the new Ty Cobb," as the ballclub hoped he would be just as much of a star as the Hall of Famer from Georgia.

The skein lasted from April 17 through May 9, and Rucker batted .333 with 28 hits in 84 at bats, with six doubles and two home runs. It was halted on May 11, 1945, by Frank Dasso of the Cincinnati Reds. During his MLB career, Rucker amassed 711 hits, including 105 doubles and 39 triples.

Rucker's professional career extended from 1938 to 1952, although he sat out the 1951 season.

Rucker is featured on the cover of the April 1, 1940 issue of Life magazine.

References

External links

1917 births
1985 deaths
Atlanta Crackers players
Baseball players from Georgia (U.S. state)
Jersey City Giants players
Macon Peaches players
Major League Baseball outfielders
New York Giants (NL) players
Portland Beavers players
Sacramento Solons players
Seattle Rainiers players